Orange2Fly was a Greek charter airline offering wet lease, charter and ad hoc flights headquartered at Athens International Airport, until it ceased all operations in September 2021.

History 

The airline was founded in September 2015 by Greek investor Pantelis Sofianos. It received its first aircraft, an Airbus A320-200, in June 2016 and started operations on 20 July 2016. The airline’s fleet had grown to include four Airbus A320 aircraft by December 2018.

In early 2020, Orange2fly ended all flights at Pristina International Airport Adem Jashari, where it operated four scheduled routes to Germany and Switzerland and was the fifth largest airline in 2019.

The company was granted court protection from creditors in October 2020. As of January 2021, Orange2fly suspended all operations with plans for a restructuring. In February 2021, the Greek government declined to offer a loan. In September 2021, the company filed for bankruptcy and shut down.

Destinations 
Orange2Fly offered charter services on behalf of tour operators and other airlines and also used to operate scheduled routes from Pristina which have since ceased.

Fleet 
As of January 2021, the Orange2Fly fleet consisted of the following aircraft:

References

External links 

 Official website

Defunct airlines of Greece
Airlines established in 2015
Airlines disestablished in 2021
Companies based in Athens
Greek brands
Greek companies established in 2015